Ouitjyong Yi (1884–1924(?)), also known as Yi Wi-jong, was a Korean diplomat and military officer. His name in Russian is Vladimir Sergeyevich Li. His father Yi Beom-Jin was a politician. Yi Wi-Jong took part in World War I as a 2nd lieutenant (Podporuchik) of Imperial Russian Army and served on Eastern Front. Post-WWI, Yi joined the Bolsheviks and fought in the Red Army during the Russian Civil War.

Life 
Yi was born in 1884. In 1907 he, Yi Tjoune, and Sangsul Yi were delegated by Emperor Gojong to attend the Second Hague Peace Conference at The Hague. At that time, he was proficient in seven languages. However, they were barred from joining the conference due to the Imperial Japan's objections as the supreme Asian power of the time. However, with the assistance of the Journalists Association, Yi was able to present speech in English to 150 journalists at The Hague concerning Japan's invasions of Korea and its void legality. Ouitjyong Yi buried Yi Tjoune at The Hague and went to the United States with Sangsul Yi, and from there to Vladivostok and Saint Petersburg. 

In 1911, after his father killed himself, he became a military officer of the Imperial Russian Army and participated in World War I. After the outbreak of the October Revolution and signing of the Treaty of Brest-Litovsk, Yi joined the Bolsheviks and fought in the Red Army during the Russian Civil War. In the process, he cut off all communication with his erstwhile aristocratic wife and his family members. He fought in battle around Irkutsk against Alexander Kolchak's White Army. After the war, he served as an apparatchik in Krasnoyarsk and Chita until 1924. Not much is known of Yi's life after 1924.

Family 
His father Yi Beom-Jin was a Korean politician and diplomat. He married a Russian noble, Elizabeta Noelke (1888-1942), in 1906. The couple had three daughters; Vera (1906-1920), Nyna (1909-1940), Zena (1912- ?). Their descendants still live in Russia.

See also 
Greater Korean Empire
Koryo-Saram

References 

1880s births
Korean communists
Korean revolutionaries
Koryo-saram
Old Bolsheviks
Russian communists
Russian Marxists
Russian military personnel of World War I
Russian people of Korean descent
Russian revolutionaries
Korean expatriates in Russia
Korean independence activists
Hague Conventions of 1899 and 1907
1920s deaths
Soviet people of Korean descent